L'Arlésienne is a 1942 French drama film directed by Marc Allégret, starring Raimu and a young Louis Jourdan. It is based on Alphonse Daudet's play L'Arlésienne.

Plot
In the Camargue a local young playboy named Frédéri (Jourdan) falls in love with a young woman from Arles. His family thinks she is unsuitable as a wife because she had a fling with a soldier. His entourage attempt to cheer him up but he intends to commit suicide.

Selected Cast
 Louis Jourdan as Frédéri
 Raimu as Marc, the boss
 Gaby Morlay as Rose Mamaï
 Édouard Delmont as Balthazar, the shepherd
 Fernand Charpin as Francet Mamaï
 Gisèle Pascal as Vivette
 Charles Moulin as Mitifio, the guardian
 Annie Toinon as the rambler

References

External links
 
L'Arlesienne at Louisjourdan.net

1942 films
French black-and-white films
Films based on works by Alphonse Daudet
Camargue
French drama films
1942 drama films
1940s French films
1940s French-language films